Gertrud Emma Scholtz-Klink, née Treusch, later known as Maria Stuckebrock (9 February 1902 – 24 March 1999), was a Nazi Party member and leader of the National Socialist Women's League (NS-Frauenschaft) in Nazi Germany.

Nazi activities

She married a factory worker at the age of eighteen and had six children before he died. Scholtz-Klink joined the Nazi Party and by 1929 became leader of the women's section in Baden. In 1932, Scholtz-Klink married Günther Scholtz, a country doctor (divorced in 1938).

When Adolf Hitler came to power in 1933, he appointed Scholtz-Klink as Reich's Women's Führerin and head of the Nazi Women's League. She was a good orator, and her main task was to promote male superiority, the joys of home labour and the importance of child-bearing. In one speech, she pointed out that "the mission of woman is to minister in the home and in her profession to the needs of life from the first to last moment of man's existence."

Despite her own position, Scholtz-Klink spoke against the participation of women in politics, and took the female politicians in Germany of the Weimar Republic as a bad example: "Anyone who has seen the Communist and Social Democratic women scream on the street and in the parliament, will realize that such an activity is not something which is done by a true woman". She claimed that for a woman to be involved in politics, she would have to "become like a man" to achieve something, which would "shame her sex" – or "behave like a woman", which would prevent her from achieving anything: either way, therefore, nothing was gained from women acting as politicians.

In an account of the activities of the Seventh Nazi Party Congress held in Nuremberg in September 1935, "Germany: Little Man Big Doings", Time magazine (September 23, 1935) reported: "Fifty thousand German women and girls marshaled by hard-bosomed Gertrude Scholtzklink [sic], No. 1 female Nazi, hailed Herr Hitler with bursts of wild, ecstatic cheering which kept up for the whole 45 minutes that he addressed them in his happiest mood. 'There are some things only a man can do!' cried this Apotheosis of the Little Man. "I exalt women as the stablest element in our Reich because woman judges with her heart, not with her head! ... I would not be here now had not women supported me from the very beginning. . . .We deny the Liberal-Jew-Bolshevik theory of 'women's equality' because it dishonors them! ... A woman, if she understands her mission rightly, will say to a man. 'You preserve our people from danger and I shall give you children.' ' (Cries of 'Ja! Ja! Heil Hitler!') Many of the 50,000 women wept as they cheered, and Herr Hitler himself seemed on the point of tears as he concluded: 'When my day comes I will die happy that I can say my life has not been in vain. It was beautiful because it was based on struggle.'"

In July 1936, Scholtz-Klink was appointed as head of the Woman's Bureau in the German Labor Front, with the responsibility of persuading women to work for the benefit of the Nazi government. In 1938, she argued that "the German woman must work and work, physically and mentally she must renounce luxury and pleasure", though she herself enjoyed a comfortable material existence.

Scholtz-Klink was usually left out of the more important meetings in the male-dominated society of the Third Reich, and was considered to be a figurehead. For propaganda reasons, Nazi Germany liked to present her as influential to foreign countries, but her own views were reportedly not considered important. She did, however, have the influence over women in the party as Hitler had over everyone else.

By 1940, Scholtz-Klink was married to her third husband SS-Obergruppenführer August Heissmeyer, and made frequent trips to visit women at Political Concentration Camps.

Post-war life
At the end of World War II in Europe, Scholtz-Klink and Heissmeyer fled from the Battle of Berlin. After the fall of Nazi Germany, in the summer of 1945, she was briefly detained in a Soviet prisoner of war camp near Magdeburg, but escaped shortly afterwards. With the assistance of Princess Pauline of Württemberg, she and her third husband went into hiding in Bebenhausen near Tübingen. They spent the subsequent three years under the aliases of Heinrich and Maria Stuckebrock. On 28 February 1948, the couple were identified and arrested.  A French military court sentenced Scholtz-Klink to 18 months in prison on the charge of forging documents.

In May 1950, a review of her sentence classified her as a "main culprit" and sentenced her to an additional 30 months.  In addition, the court imposed a fine and banned her from political and trade union activity, journalism and teaching for ten years. After her release from prison in 1953, Scholtz-Klink settled back in Bebenhausen.

In her book Die Frau im Dritten Reich ("The Woman in the Third Reich", 1978), Scholtz-Klink demonstrated her continuing support for Nazi ideology. She once again upheld her position on Nazism in her interview with historian Claudia Koonz in the early 1980s.

She died on 24 March, 1999, in Bebenhausen, an outlying district of Tübingen, Germany.

Publications
 Scholtz-Klink, Gertrud (1978). Die Frau im Dritten Reich. Tübingen: Grabert. 
 Scholtz-Klink, Gertrud Über die Stellung der Frau im nationalsozialistischen Deutschland, Herbst 1939 
 Waldeck, Countess. "The Girls Did Well by Hitler." Saturday Evening Post. 11 Jul 1942: 14–60. Print.
 Wistrich, Robert S. Who's Who In Nazi Germany. London & New York: Routledge, 1995 [1982].

References

Further reading
 Livi, Massimiliano (2005). Gertrud Scholtz-Klink: Die Reichsfrauenführerin. Münster: Lit-Verlag.  
 Sigmund, Anna (2001). Nazisternas kvinnor ("Nazi Women")

External links
 Lebendiges Museum Online  
 Speech by Gertrud Scholtz-Klink: "To Be German Is to Be Strong"
 

Officials of Nazi Germany
Nazi Party members
1902 births
1999 deaths
20th-century German women politicians
People from Neckar-Odenwald-Kreis
German anti-communists
Women in Nazi Germany
Hitler Youth members
German neo-Nazis